Michel Lauzzana is a French politician representing La République En Marche! He was elected to the French National Assembly on 18 June 2017, representing the department of Lot-et-Garonne.

See also
 2017 French legislative election

References

Year of birth missing (living people)
Living people
Deputies of the 15th National Assembly of the French Fifth Republic
La République En Marche! politicians
Place of birth missing (living people)
Deputies of the 16th National Assembly of the French Fifth Republic